The "Leiden Riddle" is an Old English riddle (which also survives in a similar form in the Exeter Book known as Exeter Book Riddle 33 or 35). It is noteworthy for being one of the earliest attested pieces of English poetry; one of only a small number of representatives of the Northumbrian dialect of Old English; one of only a relatively small number of Old English poems to survive in multiple manuscripts; and evidence for the translation of the Latin poetry of Aldhelm into Old English.

Text

Manuscript

The Leiden Riddle is attested in MS Leiden, Bibliotheek der Rijksuniversiteit, Voccius Lat. 4o 106, where it accompanies the Latin text on which it is based. The manuscript was described by Herbert Dean Merritt thus:

 25 leaves, Riddles of Symphosius and Aldhelm, ninth century. At the end of the Riddles, folio 25v, is the well-known Leiden Riddle in Old English. On folio 10r, in a space [xviii] at the end of chapter headings, are written in the hand of the text the Old English glosses to nymph names.

The manuscript was probably copied in western France, perhaps at Fleury Abbey. The riddle was added after the completion of the main contents, fairly certainly at Fleury Abbey, in the tenth century, but the language of the text is older, of the eighth century. It was already hard to read by the earlier nineteenth century, and was further damaged by the librarian, Willem George Pluygers, who in 1864 applied reagents to the text in an attempt to make it more legible.

Literary origins and character of the text

The West Saxon aristocrat, monk, scholar, and poet Aldhelm (c. 639–709) composed, among many other works, a set of one hundred hexametrical 'enigmata' or 'enigmas', inspired by the so-called Riddles of Symphosius. The thirty-third was Lorica ('corselet'). This was translated into Old English, and first witnessed in the Northumbrian dialect of Old English as the Leiden Riddle; the language is of the seventh or eighth century. Unusually, the riddle is also attested, in West Saxon, among the Old English riddles of the later tenth-century Exeter Book, where it is number 33 or 35 (depending on the edition consulted). Apart from differences in language caused by dialect and date, and damage to the Leiden manuscript, the texts are the identical on all but a couple of points.

The translation has been praised for its complexity and wit. In the assessment of Thomas Klein,

 The spirit behind this rewritten riddle may be best exemplified by a pun in the penultimate line of the Exeter Book version. In the manner of other riddles, the riddle dares us to find the solution, calling the reader searoþoncum gleaw, 'clever with cunning thoughts'. As a separate word, searo has several competing senses. It may designate either a 'device' or the intellectual power that created such a device. But more specifically, searo can mean 'armour'—so the pun reads, 'clever with thoughts of armour'.

Linguistic origins and character of the text

The Leiden Riddle is an unusually archaic example of Old English, and one of relatively few representatives of its Northumbrian dialect. This is easily shown through comparison between the Leiden Riddle and the later, West Saxon copy in the Exeter Book:

The differences between these two copies are ample testament to the distances in time and space that separate them. Several are relatively superficial, representing different conventions for the spelling of what was in fact the same sound: eg. Leiden's typically early ⟨u⟩, ⟨th⟩ and ⟨b⟩, frequently appearing for Exeter ⟨w⟩ (the Anglo-Saxon letter 'wynn'), ⟨þ⟩ and ⟨f⟩. Reflecting a distinct pronunciation are the Leiden forms ueta (1), herum (4) and auefun (9), whose ⟨e⟩ versus Exeter ⟨æ⟩ represents one of the most important dialect divisions between West Saxon and Anglian; similarly significant are the vowels in, e.g., Leiden heh (4) rather than heah, uarp (5) as opposed to wearp, biað (5) next to beoð, and so on. In general, there is a far greater range of unaccented vowels in Leiden, another feature of an early date (before these merged; compare, e.g., innaðae (2) with innaðe, hlimmith (6) with hlimmeð); and some important differences in inflexional endings (viz. Leiden's early preterite plural auefun (9), Exeter's late awæfan).

Editions and Translations
 Foys, Martin et al. (eds.) Old English Poetry in Facsimile Project, (Madison, WI: Center for the History of Print and Digital Culture, 2019-). Online edition annotated and linked to digital facsimile, with a modern translation.

Recordings

 Michael D. C. Drout, 'Riddle 35', performed from the Anglo-Saxon Poetic Records edition (25 October 2007).

References

Riddles
Old English literature